Nicolás de Jesús López Rodríguez (born 31 October 1936) is the archbishop emeritus of Santo Domingo, Dominican Republic. He is a cardinal of the Roman Catholic Church.

Early years 
He was ordained on 18 March 1961 by Francisco Panal Ramírez OFM, bishop of La Vega. He served as Vicar cooperator of the cathedral of La Vega, 1961–1963. Further studies in Rome, 1963–1965. Chancellor and secretary of the diocesan curia of La Vega, 1966–1968. Further studies, Rome, 1968–1969. In the diocese of La Vega, 1969–1978, diocesan assessor for the pastoral of the youth and pastor of the cathedral, 1969–1970. Vicar for the pastoral and pro-vicar general, 1970–1976. Vicar general, 1976–1978.

At the Pontifical University of St. Thomas Aquinas Angelicum he earned a licentiate in social science in 1965.

Besides his native Spanish, he speaks Italian, English, German, Portuguese and Latin.

Episcopate
He was appointed bishop of San Francisco de Macorís on 16 January 1978 by Pope Paul VI and was consecrated on 25 February 1978 by Cardinal Octavio Antonio Beras Rojas, archbishop of Santo Domingo, assisted by Juan Antonio Flores Santana, bishop of La Vega, and by Jesús María De Jesús Moya, auxiliary of Santiago de los Caballeros. He served as rector of the University of San Francisco de Macorís from 1979 to 1984. He was promoted to the metropolitan and primatial see of Santo Domingo on 15 November 1981. He was elected president of the Conference of the Dominican Episcopate in July 1984 and served as President of the Latin American Episcopal Council from 25 April 1991 to 1994. He was created Cardinal and assigned the titular church of San Pio X alla Balduina in the consistory of 28 June 1991.

He participated as cardinal elector in the papal conclaves of 2005 and 2013. When he reached age 80 in 2016, he became a non-elector.

He held the title of "Primate of the Indies", because the diocese of Santo Domingo was the first erected in the New World.

Pope Francis accepted his resignation on 4 July 2016, naming Francisco Ozoria Acosta, Bishop of San Pedro de Macorís, to succeed him. At the time his resignation was accepted, Lopez Rodríguez had rarely been seen in public for several months. He broke his silence early in September by writing an open letter apologizing to anyone he had offended while Archbishop. He said he felt no bitterness toward those who disagreed with him and professed joy at his successor's appointment.

Ozoria Acosta also succeeded Lopez Rodriguez as Ordinary of the Military Bishopric of Dominican Republic on 2 January 2017.

Views
López Rodríguez organized a meeting of the Latin American bishops held in Santo Domingo in 1992, which was a showcase for his very traditional views, described as "temporalist and pyramidal" by veteran Vatican observer Giancarlo Zizola. He tends to support the integralist view that the organic relationship of social classes supersedes social differentiation and social conflicts. He has advocated adding the Catholic feast of the Annunciation, 25 March, to the national holidays celebrated in the Dominican Republic.

Recall of nuncio accused of sexual abuse
In July 2013, López Rodríguez reported to Pope Francis personally that the papal nuncio to the Dominican Republic was rumored to have engaged in the sexual abuse of minors, which resulted in the nuncio's recall. He continued for several weeks to praise the nuncio, Józef Wesołowski, in public and say that his recall was routine. By the second week of September he asked the civil authorities to investigate the matter with "determination".

Homosexuality
During a 27 June 2013 interview, responding to a question about Barack Obama's appointment of Wally Brewster, an openly gay man, as U.S. ambassador to the Dominican Republic (D.R.), Lopez Rodriguez expressed his opposition to the appointment of a homosexual ambassador and said it was an attempt to promote the approval of same-sex marriages in the D.R. Moments later, when asked about problems between Haiti and the D.R. resulting from Haiti's claim that bird flu could be found in the D.R., Cardinal López Rodríguez laughed and said: "After talking about faggots and lesbians, now we'll talk about chickens". In the Dominican Republic, the word pájaro (bird) is used to refer pejoratively to a male homosexual.

In June 2014, after Brewster and his husband released a video promoting the celebration of June as Gay Pride Month, Lopez Rodriguez said "Diplomacy is not for that sort of thing, an absolutely negative propaganda" and that Brewster should "take his gay pride elsewhere". In December 2015, a week after Brewster criticized corruption in the Dominican Republic, Lopez Rodriguez said "That man [Brewster] needs to go back to his embassy. Let him focus on housework, since he's the wife to a man." These remarks were criticised by the US State Department. US Senator Dick Durbin asked Pope Francis to ask Rodriguez to treat Brewster with respect, citing the Pope's comments on the need to respect the dignity of all.

References

External links

 

1936 births
Living people
Roman Catholic archbishops of Santo Domingo
Dominican Republic cardinals
Pontifical Gregorian University alumni
Cardinals created by Pope John Paul II
Dominican Republic people of Spanish descent
People from La Vega Province
Roman Catholic bishops of San Francisco de Macorís
Dominican Republic Roman Catholic archbishops
White Dominicans